The 5th constituency of Maine-et-Loire (French: Cinquième circonscription de Maine-et-Loire) is a French legislative constituency in the Maine-et-Loire département. Like the other 576 French constituencies, it elects one MP using a two round electoral system.

Description
The 5th Constituency of Maine-et-Loire is situated in the south of the department. It includes the town of Cholet.

Politically the seat has historically favoured centre right candidates until the En Marche! landslide of 2017 when their candidate, Denis Masséglia, came close to winning in the first round.

Assembly members

Election results

2022

 
 
 
 
 
 
 
 
 
 
 

 
 
 
 
 

* LREM dissident

2017

 
 
 
 
 
 
|-
| colspan="8" bgcolor="#E9E9E9"|
|-

2012

 
 
 
 
 
 
 
|-
| colspan="8" bgcolor="#E9E9E9"|
|-

References

5